Darlington is a borough in northwestern Beaver County, Pennsylvania, United States. The population was 248 at the 2020 census. It is a part of the Pittsburgh metropolitan area.

History
Darlington was settled in 1804 and incorporated on 28 March 1820, as Greersburg. It adopted its current name on 6 April 1830. Darlington is named for S. P. Darlington, a merchant from Pittsburgh.

Geography
Darlington is located at  (40.809917, −80.423381). It is completely surrounded by Darlington Township.

Demographics

As of the census of 2000, there were 299 people, 122 households, and 79 families residing in the borough. The population density was 3,217.7 people per square mile (1,282.7/km2). There were 130 housing units at an average density of 1,399.0 per square mile (557.7/km2). The racial makeup of the borough was 97.99% White, 0.67% Asian, 0.67% from other races, and 0.67% from two or more races. Hispanic or Latino of any race were 0.67% of the population.

There were 122 households, out of which 28.7% had children under the age of 18 living with them, 51.6% were married couples living together, 11.5% had a female householder with no husband present, and 35.2% were non-families. 32.0% of all households were made up of individuals, and 16.4% had someone living alone who was 65 years of age or older. The average household size was 2.45 and the average family size was 3.14.

In the borough the population was spread out, with 23.4% under the age of 18, 11.0% from 18 to 24, 26.4% from 25 to 44, 21.1% from 45 to 64, and 18.1% who were 65 years of age or older. The median age was 38 years. For every 100 females, there were 83.4 males. For every 100 females age 18 and over, there were 73.5 males.

The median income for a household in the borough was $30,125, and the median income for a family was $38,750. Males had a median income of $25,625 versus $22,000 for females. The per capita income for the borough was $15,938. About 3.9% of families and 9.2% of the population were below the poverty line, including 10.9% of those under the age of eighteen and 9.7% of those sixty five or over.

Education
Children in Darlington are served by the Blackhawk School District. The current schools serving Darlington are:
 Patterson Primary School –  grades K-2
 Blackhawk Intermediate School – grades 3-5
 Highland Middle School – grades 6-8
 Blackhawk High School – grades 9-12

See also 
Greersburg Academy
Daniel Leasure
William Swan Plumer

References

Populated places established in 1804
Pittsburgh metropolitan area
Boroughs in Beaver County, Pennsylvania
1820 establishments in Pennsylvania